List of presidential designates of Colombia

Below is a list of the office-holders until it was abolished and replaced by the restoration of the post of Vice President of Colombia in 1994.

Republic of New Granada

Granadine Confederation

Colombia

References

See also 
Presidential Designate
List of vice presidents of Colombia

Politics of Colombia
Presidential Designates of Colombia
Political office-holders in Colombia